Kotturu is a village in Srikakulam district of the Indian state of Andhra Pradesh. It is located in Kothuru mandal of Palakonda revenue division.

Geography
It has an average elevation of 59 meters (196 feet). It is now developing towards richness.

Assembly constituency
Kothuru was an Assembly Constituency in Andhra Pradesh. However, Kothuru Assembly Constituency ceases to exist as an assembly constituency as per the delimitation process recently carried out.

 1978: Viswasarai Narasimha Rao, Indian National Congress
 1983: Nimmaka Gopal Rao, Telugu Desam Party
 1985: Viswasarai Narasimha Rao, Indian National Congress
 1989: Nimmaka Gopal Rao, Telugu Desam Party
 1994: Nimmaka Gopal Rao,  Telugu Desam Party
 1999: Nimmaka Gopal Rao, Telugu Desam Party
 2004: Janni Minathi Gomango Indian National Congress

References 

Villages in Srikakulam district
Mandal headquarters in Srikakulam district